Music Inc. is an album by American jazz trumpeter Charles Tolliver's Music Inc. with a Big Band recorded in 1970 and first released on the Strata-East label.

Reception

The Allmusic review by  Jason Ankeny awarded the album 4½ stars stating "The remarkable Music, Inc. Big Band remains the apotheosis of trumpeter Charles Tolliver's singular creative vision. Rarely if ever has a big band exhibited so much freedom or finesse, while at the same time never overwhelming the virtuoso soloists on whom the performances pivots".

Track listing
All compositions by Charles Tolliver except as indicated
 "Ruthie's Heart" - 6:19		
 "Brilliant Circles" (Stanley Cowell) - 4:53
 "Abscretions" (Cowell) - 7:03
 "Household of Saud" - 6:42
 "On the Nile" - 9:51
 "Departure" (Cowell) - 5:04

Personnel
Charles Tolliver - trumpet
Stanley Cowell - piano
Cecil McBee - bass
Jimmy Hopps - drums
Bobby Brown - flute
Wilbur Brown, Jimmy Heath, Clifford Jordan - flute, tenor saxophone
Howard Johnson -  baritone saxophone, tuba
Lorenzo Greenwich, Virgil Jones, Danny Moore, Richard Williams - trumpet
Garnett Brown, Curtis Fuller, John Gordon, Dick Griffin - trombone

References

1971 albums
Charles Tolliver albums
Strata-East Records albums